Biard is a locality in the Vienne department in the Poitou-Charentes region in western France; see also Vouneuil-sous-Biard.

Biard may also refer to:

Biard (surname)
Biard (grape), white French wine grape, aka Bia blanc, Bear, Beard

See also
Baird (disambiguation)